Teemu Suninen (born February 1, 1994) is a Finnish rally driver. Suninen was driving for Malcolm Wilson's M-Sport WRT in WRC between 2017 and 2021. His manager is Timo Jouhki.

Rally career
Suninen won the WRC-3 class in the 2014 Rally Finland and 2015 Rally Italia Sardegna driving a Citroën DS3 R3T, and won the WRC-2 class in the 2015 Wales Rally GB driving a Škoda Fabia S2000.

The Finn competed full-time at the 2016 World Rally Championship-2 with a Škoda Fabia R5. He won at Mexico with TGS Worldwide, and at Italy and Poland with Oreca, finishing third in the drivers' championship behind Esapekka Lappi and Elfyn Evans.

For the 2017 World Rally Championship-2, he joined M-Sport to drive a Ford Fiesta R5. He scored a win at Spain and three runner-up finishes, ranking third in points behind Pontus Tidemand and Eric Camilli.

Suninen will do a double program with M-Sport in 2018, entering some races with a Ford Fiesta WRC and the rest with a Ford Fiesta R5.

Racing record

WRC results

* Season still in progress.

WRC-2 results

WRC-3 results

Complete FIA European Rallycross Championship results

JRX Cup

Super1600

References

External links

 Profile at ewrc-results.com

Living people
1994 births
Finnish rally drivers
World Rally Championship drivers
People from Tuusula
Sportspeople from Uusimaa
21st-century Finnish people
Hyundai Motorsport drivers
Oreca drivers
M-Sport drivers